Roger Bingham is a British science educator.

Roger Bingham may also refer to:

Roger Bingham, actor in The Last Train (TV series)
Roger Bingham, participant in Survivor: The Australian Outback